Patrick Doyle was one of six men hanged in Mountjoy Prison on the morning of 14 March 1921. He was aged 29 and lived at St. Mary's Place, Dublin. He was one of The Forgotten Ten.

Background
Doyle was involved in an arms raid on Collinstown Aerodrome in 1919. Together with Frank Flood, he was involved in planning several attempts to free Kevin Barry from Mountjoy in the days before Barry's own execution in November 1920.  Flood would later be hanged on the same morning as Doyle.

Arrest, detention and execution
Doyle was a member of 'F' Company, 1st Battalion, Dublin Brigade, Irish Republican Army and was tried on 24 February 1921 by court-martial, charged with high treason and levying war against the King for his part in an attempted ambush at Drumcondra on 21 January that year. The six men were hanged in pairs beginning at 6 in the morning. 

He was a carpenter and married with four children. His wife gave birth to twins shortly before his death, one of whom died on 12 March. Reportedly, she caught a chill returning from a visit to the prison. Doyle's brother Seán was killed in action at the Custom House six weeks after the execution.

Re-interment

He is one of a group of men hanged in Mountjoy Prison in the period 1920-1921 commonly referred to as The Forgotten Ten. In 2001 he and the other nine, including Kevin Barry and Frank Flood, were exhumed from their graves in the prison and given a full State Funeral. He is now buried in Glasnevin Cemetery, Dublin.

References

1892 births
1921 deaths
Irish Republican Army (1919–1922) members
Burials at Glasnevin Cemetery
20th-century executions by the United Kingdom
People executed by the British military by hanging
Irish Republicans killed during the Irish War of Independence
People executed for treason against the United Kingdom
Executed Irish people